St Finian's (Newcastle) GAA is a Gaelic Athletic Association club in based in Newcastle-Lyons, in the west of County Dublin.

The club has adult football and ladies football teams and underage teams at various levels. St Finian's won promotion to the Dublin Intermediate Football Championship in 2018 by defeating Craobh Chiaráin in the Dublin Junior 1 Football Championship final.

Honours
 Dublin Intermediate Football Championship: winner 1949
 Dublin Junior 1 Football Championship: winner 2018
 Dublin Under 21 Football Championship winner 2004 -

References

External links
Official website

Gaelic games clubs in South Dublin (county)
Gaelic football clubs in South Dublin (county)